Lucrezia Borgia is a 1940 Italian historical film directed by Hans Hinrich and starring Isa Pola, Friedrich Benfer and Carlo Ninchi. The film portrays the life of Lucrezia Borgia (1480-1519), one of a number of Italian films of the era set during the Renaissance. It was made at the Scalera Studios in Rome.

Cast
 Isa Pola as Lucrezia Borgia  
 Friedrich Benfer as Alessandro Strozzi 
 Carlo Ninchi as Ranuccio  
 Nerio Bernardi as Alfonsino d'Este, duca di Ferrara  
 Pina De Angelis as Barbara Torelli  
 Luigi Almirante as Riccio, il giullare 
 Guido Lazzarini as Pietro Bembo  
 Lina Marengo as La nutrice di Barbara  
 Nicola Maldacea as Cosimo  
 Giulio Tempesti as L'ambasciatore di Milano  
 Amina Pirani Maggi as Beatrice 
 Giovanni Stupin as Il taverniere  
 Luigi Zerbinati as Un ubriaco nella taverna  
 Juan Calvo as Una spia di Riccio nella taverna

References

Bibliography 
 Moudarres, Andrea & Purdy Moudarres, Christiana. New Worlds and the Italian Renaissance: Contributions to the History of European Intellectual Culture. BRILL, 2012.

External links 
 

1940 films
Italian historical drama films
Italian black-and-white films
1940s historical drama films
1940s Italian-language films
Films directed by Hans Hinrich
Films set in Italy
Films set in the 16th century
Cultural depictions of Lucrezia Borgia
Films shot at Scalera Studios
1940 drama films
1940s Italian films